The Singular Adventures of The Style Council is the first greatest hits album by the Style Council, released in 1989. Subtitled Greatest Hits Vol.1, there was never a 'Volume 2' although other Style Council singles albums have been released, such as Greatest Hits in 2000. However, the two compilations have different track listings in that Singular Adventures generally features full length versions, alongside some album tracks, is not run in chronological order and contains two less songs.

The album cover is a photograph showing all four members taken in 1987, an outtake from the photo session producing the US album cover to The Cost of Loving. Other photographs from the session were later used for Here's Some That Got Away and Greatest Hits.

"Promised Land", a non-album single from 1989, was from the sessions for the band's Modernism: A New Decade album, recorded in 1989 but unreleased due to Polydor's demands (this album was released instead) and not released until 1998. The single was released as a new song from this album. The album was released in March 1989 around the time of the band's split to positive reviews and reached number 3 in the UK Album Chart.

Track listing
"You're the Best Thing (single edit)" – 4:30 original from Café Bleu
"Have You Ever Had It Blue? (12" version)" – 3:23 Non-album single
"Money-Go-Round, Parts 1 & 2" – 7:42 from Introducing The Style Council
"My Ever Changing Moods (12" version)" – 5:40 original version from Café Bleu
"Long Hot Summer (12" version)" – 6:56 from Introducing The Style Council
"The Lodgers" – 3:39 from Our Favourite Shop
"Walls Come Tumbling Down!" – 3:24 from Our Favourite Shop
"Shout to the Top!" – 3:27 Non-album single
"Wanted" – 3:25 Non-album single
"It Didn't Matter (single edit)" – 4:51 original from The Cost of Loving
"Speak Like a Child" – 3:15 from Introducing The Style Council
"A Solid Bond in Your Heart" – 3:16 from My Ever Changing Moods
"Life at a Top Peoples Health Farm" – 4:26 from Confessions of a Pop Group 
"Promised Land" – 2:48 Non-album single
"How She Threw It All Away" – 4:17 from Confessions of a Pop Group
"Waiting" – 4:27 from The Cost of Loving

Charts

References

The Style Council albums
1989 greatest hits albums
Polydor Records compilation albums